Her Story is a 2016 drama web series produced exclusively for Internet distribution. The set of six 9-minute episodes tells the story of two transgender women, played by Jen Richards and Angelica Ross, living in Los Angeles and their struggles in dating and in their professional lives.

Characters

Episodes

Production 
Jen Richards originally planned on producing the web series for $10,000, but when producer Kate Fisher joined the project, $40,000 was raised through crowdfunding, and the series budget capped at $150,000 with the addition of two grants and money from Fisher's savings for graduate school. Richards claims she was able to publicize the series widely in part due to her connections with trans people, especially those like Caitlyn Jenner, with whom Richards worked with on her show I Am Cait, and others such as Laverne Cox, Kerry Washington, and Eve Ensler (who came on as an executive producer).

Awards and nominations

References

2016 in LGBT history
2016 web series debuts
2010s American LGBT-related drama television series
American LGBT-related web series
Transgender-related television shows